Percival William Gibson  (15 September 1893 – 3 April 1970) was the Anglican Bishop of Jamaica from 1955 until 1967.

He was educated at St. George's College and London University and ordained in 1918. His first posts were curacies at Golden Grove, Jamaica and St George's, Kingston.  Later he was headmaster of Kingston College, Jamaica before elevation to the episcopate as suffragan bishop of Kingston in 1947. After eight years he was promoted to be its diocesan and served until 1967. He founded the Glenmuir High School and opened the doors to the school on 15 September 1958 to 55 boys and girls.

References

1893 births
Alumni of the University of London
20th-century Anglican bishops in the Caribbean
Anglican bishops of Jamaica
Commanders of the Order of the British Empire
1970 deaths